Auberge De Kieviet is a restaurant located in Wassenaar, Netherlands. It was a fine dining restaurant that was awarded one or two Michelin stars in the period 1961–1991. In 1986 the restaurant was sold to Bob Goudsmit, at that time already owner of Molen De Dikkert. In 1992, Goudsmit went bankrupt and with him both restaurants. During the bankruptcy, it was sold to Tartuffe Holding, the company that owned Vreugd en Rust. In 2006 the Fletcher Group took over the hotel and restaurant.

GaultMillau did not award any points.

Star history
 1961–1969: one star
 1970–1972: two stars
 1973: one star
 1974–1975: no stars
 1976–1985: one star
 1986: no stars
 1987–1991: one star

See also
 List of Michelin starred restaurants in the Netherlands

References

External links
 

Restaurants in the Netherlands
Michelin Guide starred restaurants in the Netherlands
Wassenaar